Garry Cook is a British sports executive, having worked for Manchester City between 2008 and 2011 and Nike between 1996 and 2008 and the mixed martial arts organization the UFC between 2012 and 2016.

Biography
Cook was born in Birmingham. He moved to the United States in 1985.

Nike
Cook started working for sports wear brand Nike in 1996. Cook worked his way up to head of the Nike project "Brand Jordan", working very closely with basketball star Michael Jordan while working at Nike.

Manchester City
On becoming the new owner of Manchester City, Thaksin Shinawatra contacted Cook about becoming CEO of the club after the departure of Alistair Mackintosh. Cook accepted the offer and was appointed CEO of the club in May 2008.  His salary was £1,500,000 in 2009.

One of Cook's first tasks with his new club was to find a new manager after Sven-Göran Eriksson had been dismissed; he targeted Mark Hughes of Blackburn Rovers. On 4 June 2008, Hughes signed a three-year deal with the club. On the day Hughes was unveiled to the media, Cook stated: "I am delighted to welcome Mark on board, In our view he is the brightest young manager in the game and he was our number one target for the manager's job."

In August 2008 he criticised club captain Richard Dunne, who the fans had voted player of the year for the previous four seasons, saying: "China and India are gagging for football content to watch and we're going to tell them that City is their content. We need a superstar to get through that door. Richard Dunne doesn't roll off the tongue in Beijing". He also said of Thaksin, "Is he a nice guy? Yes. Is he a great guy to play golf with? Yes. Has he got the finances to run a club? Yes....Whether he's guilty of something over there, I can't worry too much about....Morally, I feel comfortable in this environment". Just over a year later Cook said he felt "dreadful" about having made that comment. "I have made some mistakes in my life", Cook said, "but I deeply regretted my failure to do proper research on Thaksin".

Cook's new task was player recruitment, completing the signings of Tal Ben Haim, Jo, Vincent Kompany, Pablo Zabaleta and Shaun Wright-Phillips.

On 1 September, Manchester City were taken over by the Abu Dhabi United Group. Cook subsequently completed the transfer of Brazilian Robinho to the club from Real Madrid for a British transfer record of £32.5 million. After the arrival of the new Abu Dhabi based owners many thought that they would opt for their own CEO but they decided to keep Cook on. They did, however, appoint a new chairman, Khaldoon Al Mubarak, who replaced the outgoing Shinawatra.

After the 2009 January transfer window opened Mark Hughes and Cook sealed signings for Wayne Bridge, Craig Bellamy, Shay Given and Nigel de Jong. However, Cook failed in a world record bid to bring Kaká to the club, blaming the breakdown in negotiations on A.C. Milan.

Cook also did much work away from transfers introducing the "My first City game" campaign where supporters of the club write in their memories of their first ever game watching the team, these have then been placed around the interior of the stadium. Many fans have contributed to this, including Ricky Hatton.

After City finished 10th in the Premier League in Cook's first season with the club, he went about bringing in further targets of Hughes. In the summer of 2009 Cook signed Gareth Barry, Roque Santa Cruz, Stuart Taylor, Carlos Tevez, Emmanuel Adebayor, Kolo Touré, Joleon Lescott and Sylvinho. Cook also built his own team around him with Brian Marwood joining the club.

Alongside Al Mubarak, Cook oversaw a complete overhaul of the club's training base at Carrington, and scheduled a 2009 summer tour of South Africa where the squad met Nelson Mandela.

He made a gaffe by welcoming Uwe Rösler to the Manchester United Hall of Fame instead of the Manchester City Hall of Fame, and was booed by Manchester City fans. He wrote apology letters to 70 Manchester City supporters' clubs.

On 19 December 2009, Cook was key in relieving Mark Hughes of his duties as City's manager, after just two wins in twelve games, and appointing former Inter Milan manager Roberto Mancini as his replacement.

In September 2011, Cook offered his resignation after insensitive email allegations towards a player's mother. The Manchester City board believed there was evidence to back the allegations and accepted his resignation on 9 September 2011. Chairman Khaldoon Al Mubarak thanked Cook for his efforts in transforming the club's infrastructure and direction.

UFC

In September 2012, Cook was appointed Executive Vice President and Managing Director of Europe, Middle East and Africa for the UFC. He was fired from the UFC in a later round of staffing cuts initiated after the sale of Zuffa, LLC to WME-IMG.

References

Living people
Businesspeople from Birmingham, West Midlands
Manchester City F.C. directors and chairmen
British chief executives
Year of birth missing (living people)